Pathlow is a hamlet in the English county of Warwickshire. Pathlow lies to the east of the village of Wilmcote (where the population is included) some three miles north from Stratford-upon-Avon.

External links 

Villages in Warwickshire